Technical University of Kaiserslautern (German: Technische Universität Kaiserslautern, also known as TU Kaiserslautern or TUK) is a public research university in Kaiserslautern, Germany.

There are numerous institutes around the university, including two Fraunhofer Institutes (IESE and ITWM), the Max Planck Institute for Software Systems (MPI SWS), the German Research Center for Artificial Intelligence (DFKI), the Institute for Composite Materials (IVW) and the Institute for Surface and Thin Film Analysis (IFOS), all of which cooperate closely with the university.

TU Kaiserslautern is organized into 12 faculties.  Approximately 14,869 students are enrolled at the moment. The TU Kaiserslautern is part of the Software-Cluster along with the Technische Universität Darmstadt, the Karlsruhe Institute of Technology and Saarland University. The Software-Cluster won the German government's Spitzencluster competition, the equivalence to the German Universities Excellence Initiative for clusters.

History
The University of Kaiserslautern was founded on 13 July 1970 by the state of Rhineland-Palatinate as a constituent member of the twin University of Trier-Kaiserslautern. 191 students matriculated in the winter semester 1970/1971 in the Faculties of Mathematics, Physics and Technology. In 1972 the Faculties of Chemistry and Biology were founded. At the same time the Faculty of Technology was split into the Faculties of Mechanical Engineering and Electrotechnology, Architecture/Regional and Environmental Planning/Educational Sciences.

In 1975 the twin university was split into two independent universities: University of Trier and the University of Kaiserslautern. The Faculties, which were established successively, continuously strengthened the university's scientific character: Electrotechnology (1975), later Electrical and Computer Engineering (1999), Computer Science (1975), Engineering (1975), later Mechanical and Process Engineering (1995), Architecture/Regional and Environmental Planning/Civil Engineering (1978–1979) and Social and Economic Studies (1985). The official name of the university is Technische Universität Kaiserslautern according to the new law on Higher Education of the Land Rhineland Palatinate which came into force on 1 September 2003.

Organization

Faculties
These are the 12 faculties in which the university is divided:

Architecture
Biology
Civil Engineering
Chemistry
Electrical and Computer Engineering
 Computer Science
Mechanical and Process Engineering
Mathematics
Physics
Regional and Environmental Planning
Social Sciences
Business Studies and Economics

Research fields

The integration of engineering and natural sciences is one of TU Kaiserslautern's main objectives. The state of Rhineland-Palatinate funds several research initiatives at the University of Kaiserlautern:

 Advanced Materials Engineering (AME)
 Complex Data Analysis in Life and Biotechnology (BioComp)
 State Research Center for Optics and Material Sciences (OPTIMAS)
 Artificial Intelligence Enhanced Cognition and Learning
 Mathematics applied to real-world challenges (MathApp)
 Nanostructured Catalysts (NanoKat)
 Symbolic Tools in Mathematics and their Application (SymbTools)
 Center for Commercial Vehicle Technology (ZNT)

Sports facilities

The university has a Sports Hall in building 28 which includes facilities for badminton, gym, table tennis, etc. Running, hockey, basketball and football can be played in the accompanying sports grounds.

Associations and student initiatives

 Leo-Club Kaiserslautern – a youth organization of Lions Clubs International.
 Karat Racing Team e.V. – Formula Student team
 Bonding studentinitiative e.V.
 AEGEE-Kaiserslautern – local group of the European Students' Forum, fostering intercultural exchange and cross-border communication and striving for European integration
 STEP e.V. – a non-profit organization to support foreign exchange of the Faculty of Business Studies and Economics
 EMECS-thon – an embedded systems marathon open to all students from EMECS consortial universities and partner universities, where the participating teams have 48 hours to develop an embedded systems project from scratch. The event is carried out simultaneously in the universities of the EMECS consortium, as well as in several partner universities each year.
 Muslimische Studierenden Gruppe Kaiserslautern: A non profitable group of university of kaiserslautern Muslims students.

References

External links
Official website
International School for Graduate Studies (ISGS)

 
Educational institutions established in 1970
Kaiserslautern
1970 establishments in West Germany
Technical universities and colleges in Germany